Adams County is a county in the U.S. state of Ohio. As of the 2020 census, the population was 27,477. Its county seat and largest village is West Union. The county is named after John Adams, the second President of the United States.

Geography
It includes many parks and preserves, including one of Ohio's greatest archeological wonders, the Serpent Mound at the Serpent Mound State Memorial in Locust Grove. Serpent Mound lends its name to the Serpent Mound crater, the eroded remnant of a huge ancient meteorite impact crater. Other areas of note include parks and natural areas like The Edge of Appalachia Preserve, Shawnee State Park, Adams Lake State Park, and Robert H. Whipple State Nature Preserve.

Adjacent counties
Highland County (north)
Pike County (northeast)
Scioto County (east)
Lewis County, Kentucky (south)
Mason County, Kentucky (southwest)
Brown County (west)

State protected areas
Adams Lake State Park
Chaparral Prairie State Nature Preserve
Davis Memorial State Nature Preserve
Johnson Ridge State Nature Preserve
Lynx Prairie
Shoemaker State Nature Preserve
Whipple State Nature Preserve

Demographics

2000 census
As of the census of 2000, 27,330 people, 10,501 households, and 7,613 families resided in the county. The population density was 47 people per square mile (18/km2). There were 11,822 housing units at an average density of 20 per square mile (8/km2). The racial makeup of the county was 97.77% White, 0.18% Black or African American, 0.68% Native American, 0.12% Asian, 0.03% Pacific Islander, 0.11% from other races, and 1.10% from two or more races. 0.64% of the population were Hispanic or Latino of any race. 38.5% were of American, 19.8% German, 11.7% Irish and 8.9% English ancestry according to Census 2000.

There were 10,501 households, out of which 34.00% had children under the age of 18 living with them, 57.10% were married couples living together, 10.40% had a female householder with no husband present, and 27.50% were non-families. 24.00% of all households were made up of individuals, and 11.00% had someone living alone who was 65 years of age or older. The average household size was 2.57 and the average family size was 3.03.

In the county, the population was spread out, with 26.40% under the age of 18, 8.70% from 18 to 24, 28.20% from 25 to 44, 23.40% from 45 to 64, and 13.30% who were 65 years of age or older. The median age was 36 years. For every 100 females there were 96.10 males. For every 100 females age 18 and over, there were 94.80 males.

The median income for a household in the county was $29,315, and the median income for a family was $34,714. Males had a median income of $30,000 versus $20,433 for females. The per capita income for the county was $14,515. About 12.80% of families and 17.40% of the population were below the poverty line, including 20.30% of those under age 18 and 16.00% of those age 65 or over.

2010 census
As of the 2010 United States Census, 28,550 people, 11,147 households, and 7,793 families resided in the county. The racial makeup of the county was 97.7% white, 0.4% American Indian, 0.3% black or African American, 0.1% Asian, 0.2% from other races, and 1.3% from two or more races. Those of Hispanic or Latino origin made up 0.9% of the population. In terms of ancestry, 17.6% were German, 16.5% were American, 15.3% were Irish, and 9.8% were English.

Of the 11,147 households, 33.5% had children under the age of 18 living with them, 52.2% were married couples living together, 12.1% had a female householder with no husband present, 30.1% were non-families, and 25.9% of all households were made up of individuals. The average household size was 2.53 and the average family size was 3.01. The median age was 39.6 years.

The median income for a household in the county was $32,791 and the median income for a family was $40,305. Males had a median income of $37,277 versus $25,746 for females. The per capita income for the county was $17,693. About 18.8% of families and 23.0% of the population were below the poverty line, including 30.0% of those under age 18 and 16.8% of those age 65 or over.

Economy

The economy of Adams County employs 10,100 people. Its largest industries are manufacturing (1,774 people), retail trade (1,618 people), and health care and social assistance (1,599 people), and the highest paying industries are utilities ($69,063), and finance and insurance ($56,938).  A 2019 report identified Adams County as the poorest in Ohio with a 23.8% poverty rate and median household income of $36,320 ($16,000 less than the state average).  The county also has the state's highest unemployment rate at 6.8%.  Poor economic conditions led to a 2.1% decrease in the county's population during the previous five years.

Politics
Prior to 1936, Adams County was a swing county in presidential elections, holding bellwether status from 1896 to 1932. From 1936 on, the county has become strongly Republican and failed to back Republican candidates only in 1964 and 1976 since then, which also enabled it to regain bellwether status from 1964 to 1988.

|}

Government

Adams County has a three-member Board of County Commissioners who manage the various County departments. Adams County's elected commissioners are: Ty Pell, Diane Ward, and Barbara Moore.

Library
The Adams County Public Library serves the communities of Adams County, Ohio from its administrative location in Peebles and branches in Manchester, West Union, and Seaman.

In 2005, the library system loaned more than 264,000 items to its 14,000 cardholders. Total holdings were over 101,000 volumes with over 250 periodical subscriptions.

Hospital

Adams County is served by the Adams County Regional Medical Center near Seaman. The hospital was previously known as Adams County Hospital, and was in West Union.  It was renamed and relocated to Seaman, and is easily accessible from the Appalachian Highway.

Communities

Villages

Manchester
Peebles
Rome
Seaman
West Union (county seat)
Winchester

Townships

Bratton
Brush Creek
Franklin
Green
Jefferson
Liberty
Manchester
Meigs
Monroe
Oliver
Scott
Sprigg
Tiffin
Wayne
Winchester

Census-designated places
Bentonville
Cherry Fork

Other unincorporated communities

Bacon Flat
 Beasley Fork
Beaver Pond
 Blue Creek 
 Bradysville
Catbird
 Cedar Mills
Clayton
 Dunkinsville
 Eckmansville
Emerald
 Fairview
Fawcett
Grooms
 Harshaville
 Jacksonville
 Jaybird
Jessup
Jones Corner
Lawshe
 Locust Grove
 Louden
 Louisville
Lynx
 Marble Furnace
 May Hill
 Mineral Springs
Panhandle
Pine Gap
 Rockville
 Sandy Springs
Scrub Ridge
Smoky Corners
Squirreltown
 Selig
 Steam Furnace
Sunshine
 Tranquility
 Tulip
 Unity
 Wamsley
Wheat Ridge
Whippoorwill
 Wrightsville
 Youngsville

Places of interest
Great Serpent Mound
Counterfeit House in the Manchester, OH area, the only home constructed for the purposes of counterfeiting U.S. currency
Brushcreek Motorsports Complex

Notable people

Cowboy Copas, country music singer
John Glasgow Kerr, noted physician and medical missionary; founder of the first hospital for the insane in China
John P. Leedom, United States congressman from Ohio and Sergeant at Arms of the United States House of Representatives
Daniel McCann, sold the eagle Old Abe to the 8th Wisconsin Volunteer Infantry Regiment
Jack Roush, founder, CEO, and co-owner of Roush Fenway Racing

See also
National Register of Historic Places listings in Adams County, Ohio
List of counties in Ohio

References

External links
Adams County Government Website
Adams County Travel and Visitors Bureau
Adams County Public Library 

 
Appalachian Ohio
Counties of Appalachia
Ohio counties on the Ohio River
1797 establishments in the Northwest Territory
Populated places established in 1797